Altamira Formation may refer to:
 Altamira Shale, a Neogene geologic formation of California, United States
 Altamira Formation, Spain, a Cenomanian geologic formation of Spain
 Altamira Formation, Dominican Republic, an Early Miocene geologic formation of the Dominican Republic